William Archer Redmond DSO (16 October 1886 – 17 April 1932) was an Irish nationalist politician. He served as an MP in the House of Commons of the United Kingdom of Great Britain and Ireland as well as a Teachta Dála (TD) of Dáil Éireann. He was one of the few people to have served in both the House of Commons and in the Oireachtas.

During World War I, he served in the British Army as an officer with an Irish regiment on the Western Front. He was the son of John Redmond, the leader of the Irish Parliamentary Party from 1900 to 1918, and was one of a dynasty of Liberal and Irish Nationalist politicians who are commemorated in Redmond Square in Wexford town.

Early and personal life
William Archer Redmond was born on 16 October 1886 in London, the only son of three children of John Redmond and his wife Johanna. Redmond was educated at Clongowes Wood College and Trinity College Dublin. On 18 November 1930, he married Bridget Mallick of the Curragh, County Kildare. They had no children.

Parliamentary and military career
He was elected as MP for Tyrone East at the December 1910 general election and supported the passing of the 1914 Home Rule Act.

When his father called for support for the British and Allied war effort in World War I, Redmond joined the National Volunteers in the New British Army and served on the Western Front for the duration of the war, first in the Royal Dublin Fusiliers and then in the Irish Guards, rose to the rank of captain and was awarded the DSO. His fellow MP and uncle Willie Redmond, John's brother, also joined up and was killed in 1917. Three other Irish Nationalist MPs also served, J. L. Esmonde, Stephen Gwynn, D. D. Sheehan and former MP Tom Kettle.

When his father died in March 1918, William Archer Redmond resigned his Tyrone seat and successfully defended his father's seat of Waterford at the subsequent by-election. Famously he campaigned in his army uniform and wearing a black armband. His victory ended a run of Sinn Féin victories at by-elections and gave a big, albeit temporary, boost to the morale of supporters of the Irish Parliamentary Party. He did not take part in the First Dáil.

In the general election of December 1918, he was re-elected for Waterford City, becoming one of only two Irish Parliamentary Party MPs outside the six counties of Northern Ireland, and he spoke out strongly in the House of Commons against British military policy in Ireland during the Irish War of Independence.

Dáil career
Following independence, Redmond was elected as an Independent Nationalist deputy in the 4th Dáil for Waterford at the 1923 general election. In 1926, he co-founded the National League Party, appealing to former supporters of the Irish Parliamentary Party, ex-servicemen, and others, including Unionists, alienated by the policies of the Cumann na nGaedheal government. The new party won eight seats at the June 1927 general election.

However Redmond alarmed his supporters by supporting a motion of no confidence placed by Labour Party and Fianna Fáil to bring down the Cumann na nGaedheal government, and replace it with a minority Labour Party–National League administration supported from outside by Fianna Fáil. The attempt failed and in the ensuing general election in September 1927, the party won only two seats, including Redmond. The following year the National League was dissolved and in 1931 Redmond joined Cumann na nGaedheal. He died in April 1932. No by-election was held for the vacancy. His wife Bridget Redmond was elected as a Cumann na nGaedheal TD for Waterford at the 1933 general election.

See also
Families in the Oireachtas

References

External links

 Department of the Taoiseach: Irish Soldiers in the First World War

 

1886 births
1932 deaths
Irish Parliamentary Party MPs
UK MPs 1910–1918
UK MPs 1918–1922
Members of the Parliament of the United Kingdom for County Tyrone constituencies (1801–1922)
Members of the Parliament of the United Kingdom for County Waterford constituencies (1801–1922)
Royal Dublin Fusiliers officers
Irish Guards officers
Irish people of World War I
Companions of the Distinguished Service Order
British Army personnel of World War I
Members of the 4th Dáil
Members of the 5th Dáil
Members of the 6th Dáil
Members of the 7th Dáil
Independent TDs
National League Party TDs
Politicians from County Wexford
William
Alumni of Trinity College Dublin
People educated at Clongowes Wood College
Politicians from County Waterford
Cumann na nGaedheal TDs
Spouses of Irish politicians